Tucson International Airport  is a civil-military airport owned by the City of Tucson    
 south of downtown Tucson, in Pima County, Arizona, United States. It is the second busiest airport in Arizona, after Phoenix Sky Harbor International Airport.

The National Plan of Integrated Airport Systems for 2011–2015 categorized it as a primary commercial service airport since it has over 10,000 passenger boardings per year. Federal Aviation Administration records say the airport had 1,779,679 enplanements in 2011, a decrease from 1,844,228 in 2010.

Tucson International is operated on a long-term lease by the Tucson Airport Authority, which also operates Ryan Airfield, a general aviation airport. Tucson International Airport is a focus city for Flair Airlines. Public transportation to the airport is Sun Tran bus routes No. 11 and No. 25.

History
In 1919 Tucson opened the first municipally owned airport in the United States. In 1928 commercial flights began with Standard Airlines (later American Airlines); regular airmail service began in 1930. The 1936 airport directory shows Tucson Municipal at  "just north of the railroad" (since removed) referring to the site that was then being used as the city's airport southeast of the intersection of S. Park Avenue and E. 36th Street.

During World War II the airfield was used by the United States Army Air Forces Air Technical Service Command. A contract flying school was operated by the USAAF West Coast Training Center from July 25, 1942, until September 1944.

In 1948 the Tucson Airport Authority was created as a non-profit corporation to operate the airport and oversee policy decisions. The nine member board is elected by a group of up to 115 volunteer residents from Pima County, Arizona. The airport was moved to its current location south of Valencia Road and operated on the west ramp out of three hangars vacated by World War II military manufacturing companies.  A new control tower was constructed in 1958 to replace the original WWII wooden framed version.

The Tucson Airport Authority was also involved in bringing the Hughes Missile Plant (now Raytheon) to Tucson. In fact, in 1951, according to author David Leighton, it was the TAA that sold the land to the Hughes Aircraft Co., for the construction of the plant.

In March 1956 the Civil Aeronautics Board approved routes out of Tucson for Trans World Airlines (TWA), over opposition from American Airlines, but flights didn't begin until December of that year.

In April 1957 airlines scheduled 21 departures a day: 15 American, 4 TWA, and 2 Frontier. The first jet flights were American Airlines Boeing 707s and Boeing 720s around September 1960. American began flying wide-body McDonnell Douglas DC-10s from Tucson nonstop to Dallas/Ft. Worth and to Chicago via Phoenix beginning in fall 1971 and continuing through the 1970s. In 1981, Eastern Airlines was operating direct Airbus A300 wide-body service to Atlanta via an en-route stop in Phoenix.  In the late 1980s American was flying Boeing 767-200s nonstop to Dallas/Ft. Worth. The DC-10, A300, and 767 were the largest airliners ever to serve Tucson on scheduled passenger flights.

On November 15, 1963, a new terminal designed by Terry Atkinson opened with an international inspection station. The Tucson International Airport name was legitimate: Aeronaves de Mexico had begun Douglas DC-6 service to Hermosillo and beyond in 1961. In the mid-1970s successor airline Aeromexico flew McDonnell Douglas DC-9-30s nonstop to Hermosillo and on to Ciudad Obregon, Culiacan, Guadalajara and Mexico City.  Bonanza Air Lines began DC-9 jet service to Mexico in the late 1960s with flights to Mazatlan, La Paz and Puerto Vallarta, and successor airlines Air West and Hughes Airwest flew DC-9s from Tucson to Mexico with their service being extended to Guadalajara, Mazatlan, La Paz and Puerto Vallarta.
By late 1989, three Mexican air carriers were serving the airport:  Aero California with nonstop Douglas DC-9-10 jet service from Los Cabos, Aeromexico with nonstop McDonnell Douglas DC-9-30 jet service from both Guaymas and Hermosillo, and Aviacion del Noroeste with nonstop Fokker F27 turboprop service from Hermosillo.

The terminal underwent minor remodeling during the 1960s and 1970s, and its interior was featured in the 1974 film Death Wish starring Charles Bronson.

From the early 1970s to the early 1980s Cochise Airlines was based in Tucson.  This commuter airline operated Cessna 402s, Convair 440s, de Havilland Canada DHC-6 Twin Otters and Swearingen Metroliners. Cochise scheduled passenger flights to cities in Arizona and southern California.

A remodeling in 1985 doubled the size of the terminal from 150,000 to 300,000 sq ft and rebuilt the concourse into separate, two-level structures with jet bridges.

In 1987 the airport lengthened the primary runway a half-mile to the southeast for noise abatement reasons and installed arresting barriers for military planes.

A Concourse Renovation Project was finished in 2005 – the last phase of a remodeling begun in 2000 that added  to ticketing and baggage claim designed by HNTB. On March 19, 2008, the previous East and West concourses and gates were renumbered with the East Concourse becoming Concourse A: Gates A1 – A9, and the West Concourse becoming Concourse B: Gates B1 – B11.

In January 2014 the Tucson Airport Authority board approved a no-cost, 20-year property lease with the Federal Aviation Administration for a property on which to build a new federally-funded control tower to replace the 1950s vintage tower currently in use.  The new tower is located on the south side of the airport, near Aero Park Blvd.

On April 6, 2016, the Tucson Airport Authority announced the Terminal Optimization Program (TOP). The program (campaign name, A Brighter TUS) includes a variety of terminal improvements, including relocation and improved capacity at the Security Screening Checkpoints, enhanced concession and revenue opportunities, upgrade of building systems, and maximizing use of space. Renovation began in June 2016 and was completed in November 2017.

Military use
Tucson International Airport hosts Morris Air National Guard Base, known as Tucson Air National Guard Base prior to November 2018, a  complex on the northwest corner of the airport that is home to the 162nd Wing (162 WG), an Air Education and Training Command (AETC)-gained unit of the Arizona Air National Guard. Military use of Tucson Airport began in 1956, when the Arizona Air National Guard activated the 152d Fighter Interceptor Squadron, an Air Defense Command (ADC)-gained unit, which operated Korean War vintage F-86A Sabres.  At that time the "base" consisted of an old adobe farmhouse and a dirt-floor hangar with enough space for three aircraft. During its history at TUS, the wing has operated the F-86 Sabre, F-100 Super Sabre, F-102 Delta Dagger, A-7 Corsair II and General Dynamics F-16 Fighting Falcon aircraft.

Today the 162nd Wing is the largest Air National Guard fighter unit in the United States, and operates over 70 F-16C/D/E/F aircraft in three squadrons. The wing's F-16s augment the active Air Force's 56th Fighter Wing (56 FW) at Luke AFB, Arizona as a Formal Training Unit (FTU) for training Regular Air Force, Air Force Reserve Command, Air National Guard and NATO and allies' F-16 pilots.

The wing also hosts the Air National Guard / Air Force Reserve Command (ANG AFRC) Command Test Center (AATC) as a tenant unit, which conducts operational testing on behalf of the Air Reserve Component. The 162 WG also hosts "Snowbird" operations during the winter months for Air Force, Air Force Reserve Command, and Air National Guard F-16 and Fairchild Republic A-10 Thunderbolt II units from northern tier bases in the continental United States, as well as Canadian Forces and Royal Air Force flying units.

Not counting students or transient flight crews, the installation employs over 1,700 personnel, over 1,100 of whom are full-time Active Guard and Reserve (AGR) and Air Reserve Technician (ART) personnel, and the remainder traditional part-time Air National Guardsmen. Although an AETC organization, the 162nd also maintains an F-16 Alert Detachment for U.S. Northern Command / NORAD and AFNORTH at nearby Davis-Monthan AFB in support of Operation Noble Eagle.

Facilities

It has three asphalt runways and helipads:
 Runway 11L/29R: , with ILS
 Runway 11R/29L: 
 Runway 3/21: 
 Helipad H1: 
 Helipad H2: 
 Helipad H3: 

Airlines usually use Runway 11L. In occasional trade winds, airliners use Runway 29R, and even rarer, with south winds, Runway 21. Runway 11R-29L is too narrow for most airliners, but they can use Runway 3.

In the year ending February 28, 2018 the airport had 120,564 operations, average 330 per day: 46% general aviation, 30% airline, 11% air taxi, and 13% military. 336 aircraft were then based at the airport: 51% single-engine, 24% military, 5% multi-engine, 2% helicopter, and 18% jet.

Terminal
Tucson International Airport's terminal has three concourses: Concourse A has nine gates, A1 through A9, Concourse B has eleven gates, B1 through B11. Concourse C is in a separate building west of the main terminal and has one gate, C1. There are three levels inside the main terminal. The ground level is designated for baggage claim and passenger pick-up. The upper level includes airline ticketing, concessions, airline gates and TSA. The third level is designated for meetings and conference rooms and also includes the Tucson Airport Authority offices. Currently, Tucson International Airport offers daily nonstop airline service to 23 destination airports across the U.S. and Canada. Additionally, there are one-stop connections to more than 400 destinations around the world. Tucson International Airport's terminal is similar to that of the terminal of Seattle–Tacoma International Airport, with both in the shape of a wide X.

Both concourses inside the main terminal offer food, beverage, and shopping, and free wireless internet and charging stations.

Airlines and destinations

Passenger
{{Airport destination list | 3rdcoltitle = Refs | 3rdcolunsortable = yes

| Alaska Airlines | Seattle/TacomaSeasonal: Portland (OR) | 

| American Airlines | Chicago–O'Hare, Dallas/Fort Worth, Los Angeles, Phoenix–Sky Harbor | 

| American Eagle | Los Angeles, Phoenix–Sky Harbor | 

| Delta Air Lines | Atlanta, Minneapolis/St. Paul, Seattle/Tacoma | 

| Delta Connection | Los Angeles, Salt Lake City | 

| Flair Airlines | Seasonal: Edmonton, Fort McMurray, London (ON), Prince George, Windsor | 

| Southwest Airlines | Chicago–Midway,  Denver, Houston–Hobby, Las Vegas, Los Angeles, San Diego | 

|  | Seasonal: Minneapolis/St. Paul | 

| United Airlines | Seasonal:' Chicago–O'Hare, Denver, Houston–Intercontinental | 

| United Express | Chicago–O'Hare, Denver, Houston–Intercontinental, San Francisco |  

}}

Cargo

Statistics

Annual traffic

Top destinations

Airline market share

Accidents and incidents
 On June 3, 1977, Continental Airlines Flight 63, a Boeing 727-224 Advanced, struck powerlines and two utility poles after takeoff due to a windshear encounter. The aircraft returned safely to TUS with no injuries to passengers or crew. The plane was substantially damaged but was repaired and placed back into service.
 On December 30, 1989, an America West Boeing 737-204 (Flight 450, Registration N198AW) was en route to the Tucson International Airport when a fire in the wheel well burned through hydraulic cabling. During landing braking was ineffective and the aircraft overran the end of the runway. After colliding with a concrete structure the plane came to a stop. The aircraft was written off.
 On January 23, 2017, a Beechcraft 300 crashed near a parking structure shortly after takeoff, killing the two people on board.

References

Other sources

 
 Manning, Thomas A. (2005), History of Air Education and Training Command, 1942–2002. Office of History and Research, Headquarters, AETC, Randolph AFB, Texas  
 Shaw, Frederick J. (2004), Locating Air Force Base Sites, History’s Legacy, Air Force History and Museums Program, United States Air Force, Washington DC. 

External links

 Tucson International Airport, official website
 Non-stop routes from TUS, flight schedules
 Tucson International Airport (TUS) at Arizona DOT airport directory
 Aerial image as of October 2002 from USGS The National Map''
 
 

Airports in Pima County, Arizona
Transportation in Tucson, Arizona
Buildings and structures in Tucson, Arizona
Aviation in Arizona
Airports established in 1919
1919 establishments in Arizona